The Titans (known as the Multiply Titans for sponsorship reasons) are the northernmost top-level cricket franchise in South Africa. Its member unions are the Eastern Cricket Union and Northerns Cricket Union. The home venues of the Titans are SuperSport Park, Centurion and Willowmoore Park, Benoni.

The Titans play in the Sunfoil Series first class competition (where they were the 2015-16 champions), the Momentum One Day Cup, and Ram Slam T20 Challenge. They have been Supersport Series and MiWay T20 Challenge champions in the past, and had qualified to take part in the Champions League Twenty20 where they narrowly lost to the Sydney Sixers at SuperSport Park.

The Titans were also Momentum One Day Cup champions in the 2014/15 season, beating the Cape Cobras in the final.

In July 2018, they were one of the six teams invited to play in the first edition of the Abu Dhabi T20 Trophy, scheduled to start in October 2018.

Since the franchise system was introduced in South African domestic cricket in 2004/05,and again reverting back to a provincial system in 2021, the Titans have been the most successful winning 20 trophies.

Champions League T20
Titans played very well in their first CLT20 and qualified for the semi-finals, where the Sydney Sixers nailed a win off the last ball in front of a massive crowd at SuperSport Park, Centurion. In the 2013 edition, they played well in the group stage, winning 2 matches and facing defeat in 2, but failed to qualify at the expense of T&T and the Chennai Super Kings.

Honours
 Sunfoil Series (7) - 2006–07, 2008–09, 2011-2012, 2015–16, 2017–18, 2021-22 shared (1) - 2005–06
 Momentum One Day Cup (6)- 2007–08, 2008–09, 2013-14 (shared), 2014–15, 2016–17, 2018–19
 CSA T20 Challenge (7) - 2004–05, 2007–08, 2011–12, 2015–16, 2016–17, 2017–18, 2022-23

Players

Current squad
Bold denotes players with international caps. The below list represents the Titans squad for the 2019/20 season and active uncontracted who have represented Titans in 2018/19 and 2019/20.

References
 South African Cricket Annual – various editions
 Wisden Cricketers' Almanack – various editions

South African first-class cricket teams
Cricket in Gauteng
Cricket clubs established in 2004
City of Tshwane Metropolitan Municipality
Ekurhuleni